Inside is Orphanage's fourth album, released in August 2000 by Nuclear Blast records. The CD features 11 tracks that have been recorded at several locations during the timespan of 1997 up to 2000.

Track listing

2000 albums
Orphanage (band) albums